Nabis was the last king of an independent Sparta, reigned 207-192 BCE.

Nabis may also refer to:
 Nabis (genus), a genus of insects
 Les Nabis, a Parisian post-Impressionist artistic group
 National Ballistics Intelligence Service (NABIS)